Felipe Bustos Sierra is a Chilean-Belgian film director, producer and editor based in Scotland. His debut feature-length documentary, Nae Pasaran (2018), won the Best Feature award at the 2018 British Academy Scotland Awards, where Bustos Sierra was also nominated for Best Director (Factual). Bustos Sierra is also the founder and creative director of Debasers Filums, an independent film company based in Edinburgh and Glasgow.

Early life 
Bustos Sierra is the son of a Chilean journalist who was exiled to Belgium after the 1973 coup d'état. As a child growing up in Brussels, Bustos Sierra attended Chilean solidarity meetings, where he first encountered the stories of Scottish Rolls-Royce plant workers in East Kilbride who, in solidarity with the people of Chile, boycotted servicing the country's fighter jets following the military coup. These stories formed the subject of Bustos Sierra's first feature film, Nae Pasaran.

Bustos Sierra is an alumnus of the Eurodoc, Berlinale Talent Campus, the Independent Filmmaker Programme, and the EIFF Talent Lab.

Career 
In 2010, Bustos Sierra founded the independent film company Debasers Filums in Edinburgh, Scotland. One of his early short films, Three-Legged Horses (2012), is based on his experiences as a rickshaw driver in Edinburgh. The film was the first successfully crowdfunded film project in Scotland and went on to screen at over 100 international film festivals, on five continents, winning four awards.

Bustos Sierra was commissioned by the Scottish Documentary Institute's Bridging the Gap scheme to make Nae Pasaran as a short film in 2013. In March 2015, he launched a Kickstarter campaign to raise funds to turn Nae Pasaran into a feature-length film. The resulting documentary received critical acclaim and was nominated for Best Documentary at the British Independent Film Awards in 2018. Bustos Sierra tells the story of the Scots workers who defied Pinochet from the Scottish side, and, following five months of research in Chile, from Chileans—both oppressors and oppressed.

Filmography

References

External links 
 Felipe Bustos Sierra on IMDb
 Debasers Filums Official Website

Chilean documentary film directors
Living people
Year of birth missing (living people)